Sendaphne is a genus of braconid wasps in the family Braconidae. There are about 11 described species in Sendaphne, found in the Neotropics.

Species
These 11 species belong to the genus Sendaphne:
 Sendaphne anitae Fernandez-Triana & Whitfield, 2014
 Sendaphne bennetti Fernandez-Triana & Whitfield, 2014
 Sendaphne brasilianus Penteado-Dias, 1995
 Sendaphne broadi Fernandez-Triana & Whitfield, 2014
 Sendaphne dianariaspennae Fernandez-Triana & Whitfield, 2014
 Sendaphne jatai Penteado-Dias, 1995
 Sendaphne olearus Nixon, 1965
 Sendaphne paranaensis Scatolini & Penteado-Dias, 1999
 Sendaphne penteadodiasae Fernandez-Triana & Whitfield, 2014
 Sendaphne rogerblancoi Fernandez-Triana & Whitfield, 2014
 Sendaphne sulmo Nixon, 1965

References

Microgastrinae